Cyphers may refer to:

 Cyphers (magazine), Irish literary publication

"Cyphers" is a surname. Notable people with the surname include:

Charles Cyphers (born 1939), American actor
Jeffrey Cyphers Wright (born 1951), American poet

See also
Cypher (disambiguation)